I Was, I Am, I Will Be is a 2019 German drama film directed by İlker Çatak.

Plot
Poor Kurdish male prostitute Baran wants to start a new life in Germany with the help from pilot Marion.

Cast
 Anne Ratte-Polle - Marion Bach
 Oğulcan Arman Uslu - Baran
 Godehard Giese - Raphael
 Sebastian Urzendowsky - Johann
 Johanna Polley - Leonie
 Jörg Schüttauf - Mark

References

External links 

2019 drama films
German drama films
2010s German films